Alma is the largest city in Gratiot County in the U.S. state of Michigan. The population was 9,488 at the 2020 census. It was incorporated as the Village of Alma in 1872 and became a city in 1905.

Alma hosts the annual Highland Festival on Memorial Day weekend. It brings members of Scottish clans and interested onlookers together for a weekend of Highland dancing, bagpipes, kilts, and camaraderie.

Alma College, a small liberal-arts institution of approximately 1,300 students, is located in town and focuses on multidisciplinary learning in a residential setting.

Alma is the birthplace of both the modernist architect Ralph Rapson and writer/composer/lyricist Dan Goggin (Nunsense).

Alma was the home of Leonard Refineries which sold gasoline and other petroleum products throughout the lower peninsula of Michigan from its founding in 1936 until about 1966.

Geography

History
Alma was founded in 1853 by Ralph Ely. Perhaps first known for the Alma Springs Sanitarium, built and promoted in the 1880s by millionaire lumberman and capitalist Ammi W. Wright, it achieved its greatest prominence nationally in the 1910s and 1920s as home of the Republic Motor Truck Company, briefly the largest exclusive truck manufacturer in the world.  At one point the maker of one out of every nine trucks on the roads in the United States. It was one of the major suppliers of "Liberty trucks" used by American troops during World War I. In 1953 Alma became the first place that high-octane gas, 96 octane, was produced.

Demographics

2020 census
As of the census[2] of 2020, there were 9,488 people, 3,519 households, and 2,033 families living in the city. The population density was 1,583.4 inhabitants per square mile (610.9/km2). There were 3,784 housing units at an average density of 638.1 per square mile (246.4/km2). The city's racial makeup was 95.0% White, 2.8% African American, 0.7% Native American, 0.6% Asian, and 0.9% from two or more races. Hispanic or Latino of any race were 9.1% of the population.

There were 3,519 households, 33.3% were married couples living together, 37.7% had a female householder with no husband present, 19.6% had a male householder with no wife present, and the average family size was 2.68

The median age in the city was 30.8 years. 18.2% of residents were under the age of 18, and 17.1% were 65 years of age or older. The gender makeup of the city was 48.9% male and 52.1% female.
The median income for a household in the city was $36,408; about 24.7% of the population were below the poverty line, including 34.7% of those under age 18 and 12.4% of those age 65 or over. The employment rate in the city is 54.2%.

2010 census
As of the census of 2010, there were 9,383 people, 3,468 households, and 2,033 families living in the city. The racial makeup of the city was 92.8% White, 0.9% African American, 0.6% Native American, 0.8% Asian, 2.8% from other races, and 2.2% from two or more races. Hispanic or Latino of any race were 8.1% of the population.

There were 3,468 households, of which 30.8% had children under the age of 18 living with them, 38.4% were married couples living together, 15.2% had a female householder with no husband present, 5.0% had a male householder with no wife present, and 41.4% were non-families. 34.7% of all households were made up of individuals, and 14.8% had someone living alone who was 65 years of age or older. The average household size was 2.30 and the average family size was 2.92.

The median age in the city was 30.8 years. 21.4% of residents were under the age of 18; 21.3% were between the ages of 18 and 24; 21.1% were from 25 to 44; 20.7% were from 45 to 64; and 15.6% were 65 years of age or older. The gender makeup of the city was 46.9% male and 53.1% female.

2000 census
As of the census of 2000, there were 9,275 people, 3,220 households, and 2,022 families living in the city. The racial makeup of the city was 93.75% White, 0.53% African American, 0.52% Native American, 0.75% Asian, 0.01% Pacific Islander, 2.57% from other races, and 1.88% from two or more races. Hispanic or Latino of any race were 6.21% of the population.

There were 3,220 households, out of which 32.4% had children under the age of 18 living with them, 45.6% were married couples living together, 13.8% had a female householder with no husband present, and 37.2% were non-families. 30.5% of all households were made up of individuals, and 12.9% had someone living alone who was 65 years of age or older.  The average household size was 2.39 and the average family size was 2.98.

In the city, the population was spread out, with 21.9% under the age of 18, 20.4% from 18 to 24, 23.0% from 25 to 44, 17.8% from 45 to 64, and 16.9% who were 65 years of age or older.  The median age was 32 years. For every 100 females, there were 81.8 males.  For every 100 females age 18 and over, there were 77.3 males.

The median income for a household in the city was $33,536, and the median income for a family was $44,229. Males had a median income of $35,013 versus $20,655 for females. The per capita income for the city was $18,218.  About 8.5% of families and 11.6% of the population were below the poverty line, including 12.1% of those under age 18 and 7.6% of those age 65 or over.

Transportation

Public bus transportation is provided on a dial-a-ride service basis by the Alma Transit Center from 7:00 a.m.-8:00 p.m. during weekdays.  The transportation service is available for Alma, St. Louis, Ithaca and Pine River Township.
Indian Trails provides daily intercity bus service to Alma between St. Ignace and East Lansing, Michigan.
General aviation services are available at Gratiot Community Airport, located about 3 miles southwest of the city.

Local media 
The Morning Sun newspaper, based in Mt. Pleasant, serves the Alma area as its daily newspaper. The Gratiot County Herald, based in Ithaca, serves the Alma area as its weekly newspaper. Alma is home to three commercial radio stations.  WQBX (104.9 FM) plays satellite-fed hot adult contemporary music, and sister station WFYC (1280 AM) is an ESPN Radio affiliate.

Standalone AM WMLM (1520 AM), licensed to nearby St. Louis, plays classic country music, also satellite-fed.

The Alma area is located about midway between Saginaw and Grand Rapids, and thus also receives TV and radio signals from both cities, as well as Mt. Pleasant and Lansing.

Notable people

 Keegan Akin, professional baseball player, born in Alma
 Dan Goggin, actor and writer (Nunsense)
 Louisa Boyd Yeomans King, gardener and author; lived c. 1902–1927
 Betty Mahmoody, author of Not Without My Daughter; born in Alma
 Kevin Puts, composer, winner of the 2012 Pulitzer Prize for Music and the 2023 Grammy Award for Best Contemporary Classical Composition; grew up in Alma
 Ralph Rapson, modernist architect; born in Alma

Climate
This climatic region is typified by large seasonal temperature differences, with warm to hot (and often humid) summers and cold (sometimes severely cold) winters.  According to the Köppen Climate Classification system, Alma has a humid continental climate, abbreviated "Dfa" on climate maps.

See also
Alma College
Alma High School

References

External links

 City of Alma
 

Cities in Gratiot County, Michigan
Micropolitan areas of Michigan
Populated places established in 1853